Carabus caelatus is a species of beetle endemic to Europe, where it is observed in Albania, Austria (doubtful), mainland Italy, and all states of former Yugoslavia.

References

caelatus
Beetles of Europe
Beetles described in 1801